Wael Muhammad As'ad Al-Masri (born April 15, 1959 Kuwait) is a Jordanian architect of Jerusalemite-Palestinian descent.

Education
Al-Masri completed his bachelor's degree in architecture from the Victoria University of Manchester in 1984. In addition, he got his Master of Science in architecture studies at the Massachusetts Institute of Technology.

Career

Projects
 Al-Fahaheel Waterfront, Kuwait with Dar Al Omran.
 Heart of Sharjah Master Plan, Sharjah, UAE with Dar Al Omran.
 Heart of Sharjah Management Office Sharjah, UAE.
 Al-Majaz Waterfront, Sharjah, UAE.
 Kalba Waterfront Sharjah, UAE.
 Ahlibank Muscat, Oman.
 Mysk Al Badayer Retreat, UAE.
 Dibba Al-Hisn, Sharjah, UAE.

Positions and Roles
Founder and Chief Architect of Wael Al-Masri Planners and Architects (WMPA), established in 2009.
Member of the Royal Institute of British Architects (RIBA).
President of Jordanian Architects Society (JAS) since 2017.
President of the Fifth Architectural Jordanian International Conference held in Amman in 2016.
Partner and Chief Architect/Director of Urban Planning and Architectural Design, Head of Architecture, and Project Manager at Dar Al-Omran (Jordan).
Senior Architect/Administrator for the Jordan Sustainable Tourism Development Project, with the Washington-based company Chemonics International in 1995–1996.
Architect at the Kuwaiti Engineer's Office (KEO) from 1984 to 1990.

Awards and honors
1975-2000
 "General Merit Award" from Swindon Technical College, England. 1978.
 RIBA Napper Urban Design Prize, from the Royal Institute of British Architects. 1984.
 Haywood Prize for "The Architectural Student of the year 1984" Manchester, United Kingdom.
 Scholarship award from the Agha Khan Program for Islamic Architecture at Harvard University and the Massachusetts Institute of Technology (1991-1993).
 Awarded a travel grant from the “Friends of Morocco,” U.S.A., to visit and document traditional architecture in Morocco, 1992.
2000-2010
 "Architectural Designer of the Year 2007 Award" from Retail City Dubai for Madinat Al-Fahaheel Project, Kuwait with Dar Al Omran.
 "Islamic Architecture Award" for the Fahaheel Waterfront Project, Al-Kout, received in Dubai in October 2007. Award was organized by the Architectural Review Magazine together with the Dubai Cityscape Convention.
 “Arab Architect Award” for lifetime achievements from the Arab Towns Organization Award Foundation, in its 9th Cycle, received in Doha, Qatar on 27 May 2008.
 "Architectural Designer of the Year 2008 Award" from Retail City Dubai for Al-Manshar Shopping Center, Kuwait.
 Winner of an architectural design competition for the Ahlibank Head Office, Oman 2009.
2010-2020
 “Commercial Project of the Year 2017” Award from “The Middle East Architect” magazine, for the Heart of Sharjah Head Office Building, UAE.
 Listed amongst the "Top 45 most influential architects in the Middle East" in 2018.
 One of 50 Influential Architects From “The Middle East Architect” magazine in 2019.
 The Winner of RIBA Cityscape Intelligence Sketchbook – Culturally Significant Vernacular Architecture in the Gulf competition, the RIBA and Cityscape Intelligence.

See also
 Amale Andraos
 Chadi Massaad

References 

Living people
1959 births
Jordanian architects
Jordanian contemporary artists
Modernist architects
People from Amman
1950s births